Acanthognathus is a genus of ants that are found in tropical Central and South America. There are 7 living species and 1 extinct species, Acanthognathus poinari, known only from fossil records.

Description
They are reddish in colour and have long trap-jaws that can be compared to those of Odontomachus. These predatory ants live in small colonies that typically consist of less than 30 adults.

Acanthognathus has large, line-shaped jaws, each with an apical fork of 3 spiniform teeth that interlock when fully closed; Preapical dentition sometimes present but often absent. Jaws open to 170 degrees or more. Basal process of mandible a long curved spur that is minutely bifurcated apically; when the mandibles are fully closed, the basal processes intersect and are ventral to the labrum and at the apex of the labio-maxillary complex; when fully open the mandibles are held in that position by opposition of the basal processes alone. Trigger hairs arise from mandibles (one of each); trigger hairs lie flat against margin when jaws close, becoming erect when the jaws are open.

Taxonomy
The genus was established by Mayr (1887) to house the species A. ocellatus, described from a single worker found in Brazil.

Mistakenly, the name Acanthognathus was re-used by German ichthyologist G. Duncker in 1912 for a genus of syngnathid fish, but that is invalid as it is a junior homonym. These are now placed in either Dunckerocampus or Doryrhamphus, as the former sometimes is considered a subgenus of the latter. To further confuse, a genus of nemesiid spiders, Acanthogonatus, is frequently misspelled Acanthognathus.

List of species

References

External links

Myrmicinae
Ant genera
Hymenoptera of South America
Hymenoptera of North America
Taxa named by Gustav Mayr